"Go Girl" is a song by Pitbull, released in 2007 as the first single from the album The Boatlift. It features Trina and David Rush, who was at the time known as Young Bo$$. The single peaked at number 83 on the US Billboard Hot 100. A music video was made, featuring Pitbull, Trina and Young Bo$$ dancing in a club.

Cultural references
Pitbull makes several pop culture references in the song. He makes reference to earlier 2007 songs, ones such as "Party Like a Rockstar" by the Shop Boyz and "Buy U a Drank (Shawty Snappin')" by T-Pain featuring Yung Joc. He also makes references to Myspace and the television network HBO.

The song also samples Trina's "Party Like a Rockstar (Remix)" on her 2007 mixtape Rockstarr, as well as lyrics from the Notorious B.I.G.'s 1994 single "Big Poppa".

A sample of the song was played during a dance break during shows of the K-pop SM Town Live '10 World Tour. Hyoyeon, Yoona, Yuri and Sooyoung of Girls' Generation and Luna of f(x) performed a choreographed dance to the song.

Charts

References

2007 singles
2007 songs
Pitbull (rapper) songs
Trina songs
David Rush songs
TVT Records singles
Songs written by Pitbull (rapper)
Songs written by Soundz
Songs written by Trina